Kohnab-e Bala may refer to:
 Kohnab-e Bala, Hormozgan
 Kohnab-e Bala, Khuzestan
 Kohnab-e Bala, Kohgiluyeh and Boyer-Ahmad